is a 2014 Japanese anime children's fantasy adventure film part of the Anpanman film series and directed by Jun Kawagoe. It was released on 5 July 2014. This film is dedicated to Takashi Yanase, who died in October 2013. The movie was dubbed into English as Anpanman: Apple Boy and Everyone's Hope and was released on Tubi on April 15, 2021.

Cast

Box office 
The film grossed  during its first weekend in Japan.

References 

2014 films
2010s adventure films
2014 fantasy films
2014 anime films
Adventure anime and manga
Animated adventure films
Japanese children's films
Japanese fantasy adventure films
Japanese animated fantasy films